The 2021 Columbia Lions football team represented Columbia University in the 2021 NCAA Division I FCS football season as a member of the Ivy League. The team was led by sixth-year head coach Al Bagnoli and played its home games at Robert K. Kraft Field at Lawrence A. Wien Stadium. Columbia averaged 5,549 fans per gam.

Schedule

References

Columbia
Columbia Lions football seasons
Columbia Lions football